Plasmoacanthoma is a condition of the oral mucosa characterized by a verrucous tumor with a plasma cell infiltrate.

See also 
 Plasma cell cheilitis
 Skin lesion

References 

Conditions of the mucous membranes